HD 212710, also known as BD+85 383, SAO 3721, HR 8546 or the Tianhuang Emperor, is a star with an apparent magnitude of 5.27, located at 120.22 galactic longitude, 24.1 galactic latitude. Its B1900.0 coordinate is right ascension , declination .

References 

8546
212710
Cepheus (constellation)